Robin Ammerlaan and Ronald Vink defeated the defending champions Shingo Kunieda and Satoshi Saida in the final, 4–6, 7–5, 6–2 to win the gentlemen's doubles wheelchair tennis title at the 2007 Wimbledon Championships.

Seeds

  Shingo Kunieda /  Satoshi Saida (final)
  Robin Ammerlaan /  Ronald Vink (champions)

Draw

Finals

References

External links

Men's Wheelchair Doubles
Wimbledon Championship by year – Wheelchair men's doubles